Nicolò Sperotto (born 30 March 1992) is an Italian footballer who plays as a left-back for  club Olbia.

Club career
Born in Biella, Sperotto began playing youth football in the capital of Piedmont for Torino. He played in the various youth teams, before making 19 appearances for the primavera (U19) formation in 2010–11 that was eliminated in the play-offs by Inter Milan (of the same age group) on penalties (2–0). In 2011–12 he was loaned Lega Pro side Reggiana, making 21 appearances in his first season as a professional footballer.

On 15 July 2012, he was sold to Carpi, also in Lega Pro, under a co-ownership deal. He made 29 appearances for the Biancorossi, who were promoted to Serie B in 2012–13. On 20 June 2013, the co-ownership agreement between Torino and Carpi was renewed. On 14 December 2013 Sperotto made his Serie B debut, starting in a 2–2 draw at Bari. He ended 2013–14 with 6 appearances in the second division.

On 21 June 2014, the co-ownership agreement was renewed for an additional year. In the 2014–2015 season playing for Cosenza.

In the summer of 2015 he moved to Arezzo; later in October, his name made national news after having recorded and published an angry dressing speech of head coach Ezio Capuano after Arezzo suffered a defeat in a friendly midweek game against an amateur team. This led to Capuano eventually excluding him from the squad, and him being released by mutual consent later in November 2015. He subsequently joined Alessandria in January 2016 as a free agent. The season after he signed for Como.

After spending the second half of 2018 without a team, he returned to Fermana on 8 January 2019, signing a 1.5-year contract.

On 22 December 2022, he joined Olbia until the end of the 2022–23 season.

References

External links

1992 births
Living people
People from Biella
Sportspeople from the Province of Biella
Footballers from Piedmont
Italian footballers
Association football defenders
Serie B players
Serie C players
Torino F.C. players
A.C. Reggiana 1919 players
A.C. Carpi players
Cosenza Calcio players
S.S. Arezzo players
U.S. Alessandria Calcio 1912 players
Como 1907 players
Fermana F.C. players
Olbia Calcio 1905 players